Monodora crispata is a species of plant in the family Annonaceae.  It is native to Cameroon, Equatorial Guinea, Gabon, Ghana, Guinea, Ivory Coast, Liberia, Nigeria, and Sierra Leone.  Heinrich Gustav Adolf Engler, the German botanist who first formally described the species, named it after its curled ( in Latin) petal margins.

Description
It is a tree reaching 20 meters in height with dark brown bark with lenticels. Its hairless, dark green, membranous to leathery, oval to elliptical leaves are 5-17 by 2.5-6 centimeters. The tips of the leaves taper to a point and the bases are rounded or pointed. The leaves have 9-13 pairs of secondary veins emanating from their midribs. Its petioles are 3-7 by 1-1.5 millimeters and have a groove on their upper surface. It has solitary flowers, positioned opposite from leaves, that hang down. Each flower is born on a hairless, dark green pedicel that is 20-50 by 0.9-0.7 millimeters. The pedicels have an upper, hairless, oval, green bract that is 6-15 by 5-9 millimeters. The base of the bract runs down the pedicel, its tip is pointed, and its edges are wavy. It has 3 oval, green, hairless sepals are 5-18 by 3-6 millimeters. The sepals have flat bases, pointed tips and wavy edges. Its flowers have 6 petals in two rows of three. The outer petals are white at their base, transitioning to yellow with red-brown highlights near their tips. The, hairless, oblong outer petals are 35-70 by 6-20 millimeters.  The outer petals have flat bases, tapering tips and strikingly curled margins for which the species is named. The heart-shaped to triangular inner petals are 4-17 by 6-20 millimeters and white to yellow with red highlights near the margins. The inner petals have heart-shaped bases and pointed tips. The edges of the inner petals touch one another and are curled.  The faces of the inner petals are covered in short, straight hairs, and their margins have short curly hairs. The inner petals have a basal, hairless, bright yellow claw below the blade that is 3-8 by 1-3 millimeters. Its flowers have 9-11 rows of stamen that are 0.5-1 millimeters long. The stamen filaments extend above the anthers to form a shield. Its carpels are fused forming an ovary wall that is 1.5 millimeters wide. Its hairless stigma are 1.5-2 millimeters in diameter. The fruit are born on hairless, woody pedicels that are 3-5 by 4-10 millimeters. The hairless, conic fruit are 6-15 by 3.5-5 centimeters with a pointed tip. The fruit have 6-7 prominent ribs and green-grey. The fruit have white pulp with elliptical, smooth, light brown seeds that are 10-13 by 5-9 millimeters.

Reproductive biology
The pollen of M. crispata  is shed as permanent tetrads.

Habitat and distribution
It has been observed growing in sandy soils in secondary rain forests and along streams, at elevations from 0-400 meters.

Uses
It is grown as an ornamental tree.  Its wood is used in construction and its seeds have aromatic qualities.

References
 

Flora of Cameroon
Flora of Equatorial Guinea
Flora of Gabon
Flora of Ghana
Flora of Guinea
Flora of Ivory Coast
Flora of Liberia
Flora of Sierra Leone
Plants described in 1899
Taxa named by Adolf Engler
crispata